Fderîck or F'dérick is a town in the Tiris Zemmour Region of northern Mauritania. It is located near the border with Western Sahara, in a remote area of the Sahara desert, on the west side of the Kediet Ijill. Fderîck was constructed in the late 1950s around the former French Fort Gouraud to exploit the area's iron deposits. The iron is transported by the Mauritania Railway to the port at Nouadhibou. The city of Atar provides access to the capital, Nouakchott.

Zouérat lies 30 km east of Fderîck.

See also 
 Railway stations in Mauritania

References 
  

Populated places in Mauritania
Populated places established in 1984
Railway stations in Mauritania
1984 establishments in Mauritania
Tiris Zemmour Region